National War Museum may refer to:
National War Museum (Scotland)
National War Museum (Malta)
South African National War Museum
 National War Museum, Umuahia (Nigeria)

See also
United States
National Civil War Museum, Harrisburg, Pennsylvania 
National Museum of the Pacific War, Fredericksburg, Texas
National Prisoner of War Museum, Andersonville, Georgia
National World War I Museum, Kansas City, Missouri, 
National World War II Museum, New Orleans, Louisiana   
Korean War National Museum, Chicago

Other
National War and Resistance Museum of the Netherlands

National War Museums
Athens War Museum
Australian War Memorial
Canadian War Museum 
Estonian War Museum
Imperial War Museum, Britain
Museum of The History of Ukraine in World War II
 War Memorial of Korea